BM Andromedae (BM And) is a T Tauri star in the constellation Andromeda. Its apparent visual magnitude has irregular variations between a maximum of 11.63 and a minimum of 14.02.

Spectrum
The exact spectral class of the star is not yet known. Different estimations gives a range F8-K5Vea, meaning that there is agreement in identifying it as a main sequence star more luminous and with stronger emission lines than the usual, a typical classification for young stars that are near the main sequence phase.

The color indexes vary with the star's brightness, but the spectral class of BM Andromedae does not change with the decrease of luminosity. Strong H-alpha lines in the spectra are a sign of a gaseous envelope, while an infrared excess indicates the existence of an extended dust envelope.

System
BM Andromedae is a young stellar object with a circumstellar cloud around it, one stage of the evolution from protostars to the main sequence phase. The cloud is made of a gaseous envelope and an extended dust envelope. The latter can reach a distance of 1 AU from the star and is strongly flattened and observed edge-on. The measurements in 2005-2006 have showed a relatively compact, 0.25 AU disk.

It was also found that a correlation exists between the local interstellar magnetic field and the polarization of light emitted by BM Andromedae. Thus, the magnetic field could have played a role in the formation of the system.

Variability
The envelope blocks a fraction of the light emitted by BM Andromedae, but it's not uniform so this fraction is variable in time. This explains both the brightness variability and the one of color indexes. It was also found that the dust envelope polarizes the light emitted by BM Andromedae; the more light is blocked, the stronger is the polarization. The color of star is dependent on brightness; it becomes redder when fainter.

References

Andromeda (constellation)
Andromedae, BM
J23373847+4824119
T Tauri stars
Emission-line stars
K-type main-sequence stars